Mount Kephart is a mountain in the central Great Smoky Mountains, located in the Southeastern United States.  The Appalachian Trail crosses the mountain's south slope, making it a destination for thru-hikers.  The Jumpoff, a  cliff on the northeast side of the mountain, has views of the central and eastern Smokies.  A stand of Southern Appalachian spruce-fir forest coats the mountain's upper elevations.

Mount Kephart is the 22nd highest mountain in the eastern U.S., and the 7th-highest mountain in the state of Tennessee.  Its topographic prominence is drastically reduced, however, due to the mountain's close proximity to two higher neighbors, Clingmans Dome and Mount Le Conte.

Like much of the Smokies crest, Mount Kephart lies on the Tennessee-North Carolina border, in Sevier County, Tennessee and Swain County, North Carolina. The gap is traversed by U.S. Highway 441, the only paved road crossing the Great Smoky Mountains National Park from north to south.

Geology 
Mount Kephart is composed of a type of slate and metasiltstone known as Anakeesta Formation, which is common throughout the central Smokies.  This type of rock is exposed at Charlies Bunion, just to the northeast of Kephart.

The Anakeesta Formation rocks are part of the Ocoee Supergroup, formed from ocean sediments nearly a billion years ago.  The mountain itself was formed 200 million years ago when the African and North American plates collided and thrust the rock upward during the Appalachian orogeny.

History 

Mount Kephart is named after Horace Kephart, an author and early proponent of establishing a national park in the Smokies.  The mountain was called "Mount Collins" until the USGS gave it its current name in 1931, reshifting the name "Mount Collins" to the peak between Clingmans Dome and Newfound Gap.  Before the 1880s, Mount Kephart was known by various local names.

Mount Kephart was probably visited and measured by Arnold Guyot during his survey of the Smokies crest in the late 1850s. The name he used for the mountain, however, is uncertain. The former may refer to Peck's Corner, although Peck's Corner isn't between Laurel Top and Newfound Gap, and Guyot would have missed its elevation by a staggering .

Laura Thornborough, a writer who made many excursions into the Smokies in the 1930s, recalled a stream now known as Icewater Spring, on Kephart's south slope:

Our party reached a good spring on the Carolina side of Mt. Kephart, about three miles (5 km) from our starting point.  It had been freshly cleaned out and lined with native rock.  The water was clear and icy cold." 

A CCC Camp operated on the mountain's southern base in the 1930s, the chimney of which remains near the head of the Kephart Prong Trail.  During World War II, this camp was used to house conscientious objectors.  Also in 
this area are the remains of a WPA fish hatchery built in 1936.

Access 

The Appalachian Trail crosses Mt. Kephart's southern slope en route to The Sawteeth and the eastern Smokies. There is a backcountry shelter at Icewater Spring for Appalachian Trail thru-hikers.

The Jumpoff Trail crosses the summit en route to the Jumpoff, a high cliff on the mountain's northern slope.  The view from the Jumpoff is usually greater than 180 degrees, from Mount Le Conte to northwest to the Balsam Mountains to the southeast.  The Jumpoff Trail is just a few feet beyond the Appalachian Trail and Boulevard Trail intersection, approximately three miles from Newfound Gap.

The Kephart Prong Trail ascends the mountain's south slope to the Kephart Backcountry Shelter.  Its trailhead is on U.S. 441 between Newfound Gap and the Oconaluftee Valley.  After two miles (3 km), the Kephart Prong Trail forks, one way following the Sweat Heifer Trail to Kephart's southwest slope (near Mt. Ambler), the other continuing on to Dry Sluice Gap (near Charlies Bunion).

References

External links 

 Great Smoky Mountains National Park Trail Map — Large file in .pdf format.
 Mount Kephart — Peakbagger.com
 Mount Kephart — SummitPost.org
  Icewater Spring Shelter — Appalachian Trail backcountry shelter near the summit of Mt. Kephart
 Horace Kephart: Revealing an Enigma — Website dedicated to the legacy of Horace Kephart

Mountains of Great Smoky Mountains National Park
Mountains on the Appalachian Trail
Mountains of Tennessee
Mountains of North Carolina
Southern Sixers
Protected areas of Sevier County, Tennessee
Protected areas of Swain County, North Carolina
Mountains of Swain County, North Carolina
Mountains of Sevier County, Tennessee